McMains is a family name which may refer to one of the following persons.

Cody McMains, American film and television actor
 Jim McMains, French vocalist of Les Irrésistibles
 Steve McMains, French bass player
Juliet McMains, American dance scholar and teacher
 Maury McMains (1903-1993), American football and basketball coach
 Ross McMains, Australian basketball coach